Groß Kiesow is a municipality in the Vorpommern-Greifswald district, in Mecklenburg-Vorpommern, Germany. It consists of
 Dambeck
 Groß Kiesow
 Groß Kiesow-Meierei
 Kessin
 Klein Kiesow
 Klein Kiesow-Kolonie
 Krebsow
 Sanz (Hof I, III, IV, V, VI, VII)
 Schlagtow
 Schlagtow-Meierei
 Strellin

Transport
Groß Kiesow railway station connects Groß Kiesow with Stralsund, Greifswald, Züssow, Usedom, Angermünde, Eberswalde and Berlin.

References

Vorpommern-Greifswald